Ravaglioli S.p.A. was founded in 1958 as a manufacturer of automotive repair workshop equipment for both passenger and commercial vehicle lifting.

As of 2015, Ravaglioli S.p.A. is one of the world’s top-ranking companies in the garage equipment industry, Europe’s leading manufacturer of lifts, and among the major manufacturers of tire testing equipments. Ravaglioli has a distribution net spanning over 150 countries over the world, including branches in the United States, United Kingdom, Germany, France, Belgium, and Spain. Its primary products today include automotive lifts, wheel balancers, tire changers, wheel aligners, and complete test lanes.

The over 350,000 lifts, of the "two-post" type alone, sold throughout the world, attest to their standard of specialization and lead role they play in the industry.

Another crucial part of their product range is their equipment for tire service: this is managed by a specific organization both during design, testing and production.

Approvals & homologations
Ravaglioli S.p.A. is approved and recommended by most of the world's car manufacturers, including Mercedes Benz, BMW, Opel, Renault, Citroen, Peugeot, Volvo, and Skoda, among others.

References

Auto parts suppliers of Italy
Manufacturing companies established in 1958
Italian companies established in 1958